Ahmad-e Naseri (also Romanized as Aḩmad-e Nāşerī; also known as Aḩmad-e Nāẕerī) is a village in Tayebi-ye Sarhadi-ye Sharqi Rural District, Charusa District, Kohgiluyeh County, Kohgiluyeh and Boyer-Ahmad Province, Iran. At the 2006 census, its population was 115, in 23 families.

References 

Populated places in Kohgiluyeh County